Dubrovka is a rural locality (a village) in Gorkinskoye Rural Settlement, Kirzhachsky District, Vladimir Oblast, Russia. The population was 25 as of 2010. There are 3 streets.

Geography 
Dubrovka is located on the Sherna River, 13 km northwest of Kirzhach (the district's administrative centre) by road. Vasilyovo is the nearest rural locality.

References 

Rural localities in Kirzhachsky District